Vats is a former municipality in Rogaland county, Norway. Located in the traditional district of Haugaland, the municipality existed from 1891 until 1965.  The  municipality encompassed the land to the east and west surrounding the Vatsfjorden and the lake Vatsvatnet.  Vats is typically divided into two parts Øvre Vats (around the lake in the north) and Nedre Vats (around the fjord in the south).

History
The municipality of Vats was established on 1 January 1891 when it was split off from the municipality of Skjold. Initially, Vats had 1,095 residents.  On 1 January 1965, the municipality was dissolved due to recommendations of the Schei Committee.  The majority of Vats (population: 1,128) was merged with parts of Imsland, Skjold, and Vikedal, as well as all of Sandeid to form the new municipality of Vindafjord. On the same day, the Breidal and Stølsvik farms on the south side of the Yrkefjorden (population: 16) became a part of Tysvær municipality.

Government
All municipalities in Norway, including Vats, are responsible for primary education (through 10th grade), outpatient health services, senior citizen services, unemployment and other social services, zoning, economic development, and municipal roads.  The municipality is governed by a municipal council of elected representatives, which in turn elects a mayor.

Municipal council
The municipal council  of Vats was made up of 15 representatives that were elected to four year terms.  The party breakdown of the final municipal council was as follows:

See also
List of former municipalities of Norway

References

Vindafjord
Former municipalities of Norway
1891 establishments in Norway
1965 disestablishments in Norway